Lomonosov is a Russian masculine surname, its feminine counterpart is Lomonosova. It may refer to
 Mikhail Lomonosov (1711–1765), Russian polymath and writer 
 Sergey Lomonosov (1799–1857), Russian diplomat
 Yury Lomonosov (1876–1952), Russian railway engineer

Russian-language surnames